Beaver Hill is an unincorporated community in Coos County, Oregon, United States.

Like nearby Coaledo, Beaver Hill was formerly a coal mining community. The Beaver Hill mine was opened in 1894 by the J. D. Spreckels Company and the town was later owned by Southern Pacific. By 1896, Beaver Hill was an important community in the area and on January 11, it incorporated as a city. In 1926, 15 of the city's 16 remaining voters chose to disincorporate. Today there is nothing left at the site.

The community had a branch off the Coos Bay Line of the Southern Pacific Railroad, but it never had a post office by the name Beaver Hill. The post office at this locale was named Preuss; it ran from 1917 to 1924. It was named for a local teacher, Rosa Preuss. It is possible the name "Beaver Hill" for a post office would not have been approved because of the similarity to Beaverton and Beavercreek.

See also
Southport, Oregon

References

External links
Images of Beaver Hill from Flickr
Historic image of the Beaver Hill Coal Mine from University of Washington Libraries

1896 establishments in Oregon
Populated places established in 1896
1926 disestablishments in Oregon
Coal towns in Oregon
Company towns in Oregon
Former cities in Oregon
Ghost towns in Oregon
Unincorporated communities in Coos County, Oregon
Unincorporated communities in Oregon